Coralliope is a genus of crabs in the family Xanthidae, containing the following species:

 Coralliope armstrongi (Garth, 1948)
 Coralliope parvula (A. Milne Edwards, 1869)

References

Xanthoidea